Pain & Suffering  is an album by Rhino Bucket, released on February 6, 2007. It is a reissue of the 1994 album Pain, their first effort with Simon Wright as drummer. The "Suffering" section of the album consists of previously unreleased songs, including the band's only recorded cover song, "Bastard", and their favorite live song "Swingin' With Sally."

Track listing

 Pain  (4:34)  
 I Stand Before You   (6:14) 
 Too Much Talk  (4:36) 
 Blow by Blow  (4:27) 
 Mad Maggie   (3:38) 
 Bird on a Wire   (5:25) 
 What'd You Expect   (4:48) 
 I Was Told   (3:47) 
 The Hard Grind   (4:16) 
 World Gone Made   (5:06) 
Bonus Tracks:
 Ain't Got Solutions  (demo of unreleased song)  (3:42)  
 Head Above Water (demo of unreleased song)  (4:20) 
 Knife in You (demo of unreleased song)   (4:27) 
 Swingin' with Sally (live)  (3:37)  
 Bastard (unreleased song)  (5:24) 

All songs written by Rhino Bucket except, "Bastard" written by Ian Hunter

Rhino Bucket albums
2007 compilation albums
Reissue albums